The 2018 Kansas Jayhawks football team represented the University of Kansas in the 2018 NCAA Division I FBS football season. It was the Jayhawks 129th season. The Jayhawks were led by fourth-year head coach David Beaty. They were members of the Big 12 Conference. They played their games at David Booth Kansas Memorial Stadium, formally Memorial Stadium. The stadium was renamed following the Jayhawks 2017 season in December 2017 after a $50 million renovation was completed that was donated by Kansas alumnus David Booth.

The Jayhawks ended multiple losing streaks during the season, the longest being a 46 game road losing streak which ended with a 31–7 win over Central Michigan. The win also ended a 12 game losing streak against FBS opponents. With a 27–26 win over TCU, KU ended a 10 game losing streak against Big 12 teams. With back–to–back wins over Central Michigan and Rutgers, Kansas earned back-to-back wins against any opponent for the first time since 2011 and their first back-to-back wins over FBS opponents since 2009. Two other major losing streaks were still active at the end of the season, they have lost 44 consecutive road games in the Big 12 as well as 30 consecutive losses against teams ranked in the AP Poll. Following their 7th loss of the season to Kansas State, the Jayhawks became ineligible for a bowl game for the 10th consecutive season.

On November 5, Kansas athletic director Jeff Long announced that Beaty will not be retained as head coach but he was able to finish the season and was officially fired at the end of the season.

All-conference players lost

Returning all-conference players

Preseason

Big 12 media poll
The Big 12 media poll was released on July 12, 2018 with the Jayhawks predicted to finish in last place receiving all last place votes.

Schedule

Source:

Game summaries

Nicholls

at Central Michigan

Rutgers

at Baylor

Oklahoma State

at West Virginia

at Texas Tech

TCU

Iowa State

at Kansas State

at Oklahoma

Texas

References

Kansas
Kansas Jayhawks football seasons
Kansas Jayhawks football